A bronze statue of George Floyd (1973–2020), an African-American man who was murdered during his arrest in Minneapolis, was completed by Stanley Watts and unveiled in 2021. It is situated outside Newark, New Jersey's City Hall.

Description
Weighing , and sculpted larger than life, the statue is of Floyd sitting relaxed on a bench. Watts said of the statue that "The world needed a peaceful George".

History
The statue was commissioned by Leon Pickney. The piece was briefly displayed at Faison Firehouse Theater in Harlem, New York. It was donated to the city of Newark and installed on Juneteenth, 2021, and is to remain at its present location for at least one year.

Days after installation, on the night of June 24, the sculpture was vandalized. The face of the statue was painted black, with the name of a neo-Nazi group painted on its torso. The paint was removed shortly after by the Newark Public Works Department. The statue was vandalized a second time by a 37-year old actor in October 2021.

See also
 Black Lives Matter art
 List of public art in Newark, New Jersey
 Memorials to George Floyd

References

2021 establishments in New Jersey
2021 in New Jersey
2021 sculptures
Black Lives Matter art
Bronze sculptures in New Jersey
Buildings and structures in Newark, New Jersey
Memorials to George Floyd
Monuments and memorials in New Jersey
Outdoor sculptures in New Jersey
Public art in Newark, New Jersey
Sculptures of African Americans
Sculptures of men in New Jersey
Statues in New Jersey
Vandalized works of art in New Jersey